Michael Karlan (born 1968) is an American attorney and social entrepreneur who is known for founding a socializing and networking organization, Professionals in the City.

Early life and education
Born in 1968, Karlan grew up in Long Island, New York.

Karlan earned his bachelor's degree in business administration with an emphasis in accounting from the University of Colorado at Boulder in 1989, where he was valedictorian of his graduating class. For further studies, he attended  Columbia University School of Law, where he earned his J.D. degree in 1992 and was named a Harlan Fiske Stone Scholar. He continued his education in law and earned an LL.M. in taxation from New York University School of Law in 1993.

Career

Early career
Karlan started his legal career by clerking for Judge Julian Jacobs of the United States Tax Court from 1993 to 1995.

From 1995 to 1998, Karlan worked as an attorney, for Covington & Burling in Washington, DC. In 1998, he joined the Office of Chief Counsel of the Internal Revenue Service (IRS) as an attorney, and served there until 1999. While at the IRS, Karlan was drafter of federal regulations relating to 401(k) plans.

Professionals in the City
Karlan founded Professionals in the City in 1999 to bring the local professional community together and to familiarize residents with the activities their cities have to offer.

On December 31, 2006, when he was simultaneously hosting New Year's Eve Galas at both the French embassy and the Washington Plaza Hotel, The Washington Post wrote a cover story about Karlan that characterized him as "an expert party guy."

On December 31, 2007, Karlan hosted the farewell party for the historic Hotel Washington, Washington, D.C.'s oldest continuously operated hotel, the hotel located across the street from the White House. With more than 3,000 attendees, this was the largest party in the history of the Hotel Washington. At the same time, Karlan hosted a second Gala at the Embassy of Italy.

In October 2010, Washington, DC Mayor Adrian Fenty officially commended Karlan for Professionals in the City surpassing a membership of 200,000 in the Greater Washington, DC metropolitan area and for enhancing the quality of life of residents of Washington, DC.

In February 2011, Karlan hosted the nation's first-ever speed dating at an auto show, at which Washington Post columnist Carolyn Hax provided advice on dating and then the speed daters went from car to car in the General Motors exhibit at the Washington Auto Show participating in a different date in each car.

Bibliography

Book
 Karlan, Michael (2008). Washington, DC For Singles

Selected publications
 Karlan, Michael; Lawson, Kurt L.P. (1998). Differences in Treatment of Employees and Independent Contractors Under Selected State and Federal Statutes, American Bar Association Section of Taxation Mid-Year Meeting. 
 Karlan, Michael; Oppenheimer, Mary (1998). Cash or Deferred Arrangements, Matching Contributions, and Employee Contributions, Annual American Law Institute-American Bar Association Conference

References

External links 

 Michael Karlan website
 Professionals in the City website
 Washington, DC For Singles

Living people
1968 births
American lawyers
Columbia Law School alumni
New York University School of Law alumni
University of Colorado Boulder alumni
Place of birth missing (living people)
People associated with Covington & Burling